Jungulu Island is an island off the Kimberley coast of Western Australia.

The island is often incorrectly called Darcy Island, which is a small island found to the southern side of Jungulu proper.

Although most of the islands in the Kimberley are unallocated DEC crown land, Jungulu is one of islands near the former Kunmunya mission which are included in Reserve 23079 for Use and Benefit of Aborigines.

References

Islands of the Kimberley (Western Australia)
Bonaparte Archipelago